Kiger Creek is a tributary of Swamp Creek in Harney County in the U.S. state of Oregon. It originates on Steens Mountain and flows generally north through Kiger Gorge to meet Swamp Creek near the unincorporated community of Diamond. The combined streams flow into Diamond Swamp and the Malheur National Wildlife Refuge.

A  segment of Kiger Creek, from its headwaters to where it crosses the Steens Mountain Wilderness boundary, is part of the National Wild and Scenic Rivers System. Designated "wild", the creek supports a population of redband trout, and its watershed includes habitat for mule deer, elk, bighorn sheep, and pronghorn.

Name
Kiger Creek as well as Kiger Island in the Willamette River near Corvallis are named for Reuben C. Kiger and his family, pioneers who settled in Benton County in the mid-19th century. In 1874, they moved to Harney County to the Steens Mountain vicinity but, fearing Native Americans, returned to western Oregon in 1878. Minerva J. (Dolly) Kiger named the creek as well as one of its tributaries, Cucamonga Creek, and another nearby stream, McCoy Creek.

Recreation
Near the creek's source is Kiger Gorge Overlook, a recreation site managed by the Bureau of Land Management (BLM). The U-shaped gorge, carved through basalt by ice age glaciers, is about a half-mile deep. The site is generally open from July 4 through November 1.

Open from June 10 to November 1, the BLM campground has six sites, toilets, and picnic tables.

The Kiger Wild Horse Viewing Area, also managed by the BLM, is in the vicinity. The area has several viewing sites, generally open from May 1 to November 15.

Tributaries
Named tributaries of Kiger Creek, listed from source to mouth, include Big Pasture Creek, which enters from the right, then Mud, Little Kiger, and Poison creeks, all from the right. Cucamonga Creek enters from the left, downstream of where Kiger Creek splits into two distributaries and passes under Diamond Lane as it nears Swamp Creek.

See also
 List of National Wild and Scenic Rivers
 List of rivers of Oregon

References

External links
 National Wild and Scenic Rivers System

Rivers of Harney County, Oregon
Rivers of Oregon
Wild and Scenic Rivers of the United States